Grypus is a genus of marsh weevils in the beetle family Brachyceridae. There are about 10 described species in Grypus.

Species
These 10 species belong to the genus Grypus:
 Grypus atricornis Everts, 1922
 Grypus brassicae Billberg, 1820
 Grypus brunnirostris (Fabricius, 1792)
 Grypus distinctus Dejean, 1836
 Grypus equiseti (Fabricius, 1775)
 Grypus kaschmirensis Voss, 1960
 Grypus leechi (Cawthra, 1957)
 Grypus mannerheimi Faust, 1881
 Grypus rugicollis Voss, 1934
 Grypus vittatus Cooper, 1865

References

Further reading

 
 

Brachyceridae
Articles created by Qbugbot